The 2018 Overton's 300 was the 15th stock car race of the 2018 NASCAR Xfinity Series season and the 18th iteration of the event. The race was held on Saturday, June 30, 2018, in Joliet, Illinois at Chicagoland Speedway, a  permanent D-shaped oval. The race took the scheduled 200 laps to complete. At race's end, Kyle Larson of Chip Ganassi Racing would come back from the rear of the field to win his tenth career NASCAR Xfinity Series win and his second of his part-time season. To fill out the podium, Kevin Harvick and Cole Custer of Stewart-Haas Racing with Biagi-DenBeste would finish second and third, respectively.

Background 

Chicagoland Speedway is a  tri-oval speedway in Joliet, Illinois, southwest of Chicago. The speedway opened in 2001 and currently hosts NASCAR races. Until 2011, the speedway also hosted the IndyCar Series, recording numerous close finishes, including the closest finish in IndyCar history. The speedway is owned and operated by International Speedway Corporation and is located adjacent to Route 66 Raceway.

Entry list

Practice

First practice 
The first practice session was held on Friday, June 29, at 3:35 PM CST, and would last for 45 minutes.

Second and final practice 
The second and final practice session, sometimes referred to as Happy Hour, was held on Friday, June 29, at 6:35 PM CST, and would last for 45 minutes.

Qualifying 
Qualifying was held on Saturday, June 30, at 11:40 AM CST. Since Chicagoland Speedway is under , the qualifying system was a multi-car system that included three rounds. The first round was 15 minutes, where every driver would be able to set a lap within the 15 minutes. Then, the second round would consist of the fastest 24 cars in Round 1, and drivers would have 10 minutes to set a lap. Round 3 consisted of the fastest 12 drivers from Round 2, and the drivers would have 5 minutes to set a time. Whoever was fastest in Round 3 would win the pole.

Two drivers would fail to qualify: Morgan Shepherd and Mike Harmon.

Full qualifying results

Race results 
Stage 1 Laps: 45

Stage 2 Laps: 45

Stage 3 Laps: 110

References 

2018 NASCAR Xfinity Series
NASCAR races at Chicagoland Speedway
June 2018 sports events in the United States
2018 in sports in Illinois